Clayborne Family is the second studio album by KHM, an American rap group consisting of Kool Keith, Jacky Jasper (aka H-Bomb) and Marc Live. It was released on October 20, 2004 via Threshold Recordings and was produced by Crashman, DJ Junkaz Lou, and all the three members of the group. Tim Dog, Crash Man, Guerilla Black and Black Silver made their guest appearances on the record.

Track listing

Personnel
Keith Matthew Thornton – vocals, producer (tracks: 7-13), executive producer
Marc Giveand – vocals, producer (tracks: 7-13), executive producer
Sean Merrick – vocals, producer (tracks: 7-13), executive producer
Crashman – vocals (track 4), producer (tracks: 2-6)
Charles Williamson – additional vocals (track 2)
Christopher Rodgers – additional vocals (track 8)
Timothy Blair – vocals (tracks: 7-8)
Louis Gomis – producer (tracks: 1, 14-15)
Shoet – artwork

References

External links

2004 albums
Kool Keith albums